Efo riro is a vegetable soup and a native soup of the Yoruba people of western Nigeria. The two vegetables most commonly used to prepare the soup are Celosia argentea and Amaranthus hybridus.

Tips for making the best èfó Riro

 Reduce the water content.- This is done by boiling the pepper blend for 30 minutes to dry it out, using a tiny bit of meat stock and blanching your vegetables(instructions below).
 Roughly blend your red bell peppers- this does magic for the final appearance.
 keep the seasoning simple– you only need salt, Cameroon pepper, stock powder and crayfish.
 Do not overcook the vegetables
 Roast your meat after boiling– this step is optional but this layer of flavour is impeccable.

Ingredients 
The ingredients used to prepare  ẹ̀fọ́ riro vary, especially in which meats are included, but some common ingredients are:

 Beef
 Cow tripe (shaki)
 Cow skin (ponmo)
 Smoked fish
 Dry fish
 Palm oil (epo pupa)
 Celosia argentea or green amaranth
 Peppers (red bell peppers or chili peppers)
 Ground crayfish (edé)
 Onions
 Bouillon cubes
 Locust beans (irú)
 Salt (iyò)

Culinary accompaniments 
Ẹ̀fọ́ riro is often eaten with Nigerian swallow foods like eba, pounded yam, or fufu. Other starchy foods such as rice, rice&bean and boiled plantain may also be eaten with it.

References

Nigerian cuisine
Yoruba cuisine
Spinach dishes
Seafood dishes
Fish stews